Al-Duhail Sports Club is a Qatari professional football club based in Doha. The club was formed in 2009 as Lekhwiya Sports Club, and played their first competitive match in 2009, The club was renamed on April 10, 2017, it was decided to merge the two clubs, Lekhwiya and El Jaish SC into one entity under the name Al-Duhail Sports Club starting from the new season. The club has won a total of 15 major trophies, including the national championship 7 times also won the Emir of Qatar Cup 3 times, the Qatar Cup (ex) Crown Prince Cup 3 times, and the Sheikh Jassim Cup two times. The club has also never been out of the top division of Qatari football since his rise in the 2009–10 season.

This is a list of the seasons played by Al-Duhail SC from 2009 when the club first entered a league competition to the most recent seasons. The club's achievements in all major national and international competitions as well as the top scorers are listed. Top scorers in bold were also top scorers of Qatar Stars League. The list is separated into three parts, coinciding with the three major episodes of Qatari football:

History

Seasons 

Note 1: The first official Qatari Football League season was held in 1972–73.

Honours

National

Notes

References 

Seasons
 
Al-Duhail SC